Frankleigh Park is a suburb of New Plymouth, in the western North Island of New Zealand. It is located to the south of the city centre. The suburb is built around the site of early settler Henry King's farm, Woodleigh, the father of William Cutfield King. 

The suburb is one of the older and more established suburbs of the city, lying in the valley of the Huatoki River. It lies between the suburbs of Westown to the west, and Vogeltown to the east.

Some of the main streets include Brois Street, Veale Road, Frankley Road, Fernleigh Street, Govett Avenue, and Ashmore Drive. Frankleigh Park is home to a primary school, a kindergarten and a shopping centre, and has two large parks, Sutherland Park and Ferndale Park.

Demographics

Frankleigh Park had a population of 2,979 at the 2018 New Zealand census, an increase of 147 people (5.2%) since the 2013 census, and an increase of 99 people (3.4%) since the 2006 census. There were 1,131 households, comprising 1,479 males and 1,503 females, giving a sex ratio of 0.98 males per female. The median age was 37.7 years (compared with 37.4 years nationally), with 669 people (22.5%) aged under 15 years, 504 (16.9%) aged 15 to 29, 1,368 (45.9%) aged 30 to 64, and 444 (14.9%) aged 65 or older.

Ethnicities were 88.8% European/Pākehā, 14.9% Māori, 1.9% Pacific peoples, 5.1% Asian, and 1.8% other ethnicities. People may identify with more than one ethnicity.

The percentage of people born overseas was 17.6, compared with 27.1% nationally.

Although some people chose not to answer the census's question about religious affiliation, 54.4% had no religion, 33.5% were Christian, 0.3% had Māori religious beliefs, 1.0% were Hindu, 0.4% were Muslim, 0.4% were Buddhist and 2.8% had other religions.

Of those at least 15 years old, 507 (21.9%) people had a bachelor's or higher degree, and 342 (14.8%) people had no formal qualifications. The median income was $33,300, compared with $31,800 nationally. 429 people (18.6%) earned over $70,000 compared to 17.2% nationally. The employment status of those at least 15 was that 1,152 (49.9%) people were employed full-time, 378 (16.4%) were part-time, and 93 (4.0%) were unemployed.

Education
Woodleigh School is a coeducational contributing primary (years 1–6) school with a roll of  students as of

References

External links
 Woodleigh School website
 Map of Frankleigh Park

Suburbs of New Plymouth